Aguaray is a city in the province of Salta, General José de San Martín department, in northern Argentina, near to the border with Bolivia.

Climate

Abstract foundation 
 1911, bad experience of the first oil drilling by the Bureau of Mines of the Nation
 1917,The former employees of the national distribution, is rooted in the place "Aguaray", dedicated to agriculture and livestock, timber and trade activity.
 The first school began in 1925 of the teacher Laura Molina
 1924, the sister city is founded, Tartagal
 1928, the railway station was founded
 1938, founded the house of authority
 1939, foundation of the commissary
 1969, opens  Hospital City of Aguaray Dr. Luis Guemes

Mayors of the city 
 Laudino Delgado
 Julian Anad
 Ernesto Aparicio
 Sergio Nieva
 Lauro Roman
 Lucio Ledesma
 Juan Salas
 Rafael Bacha
 Jose Osvaldo Zelarayan
 Ismael Silva
 Federico Gonzales
 Tomas Ramos
 Sr, Hector Carlos Alberto Elizaran
 Armando Velasquez
 Sergio Nieva
 Luis Gutierrez
 Ciro Guardatti
 Horacio Cabeza
 Guillermo Vazques
 David Vera
 Carlos Orellana Garcia
 Reynaldo Chein
 Emilio Ferreyra
 Ernesto Morales
 Alberto Nazer
 Angel Eduardo Blasco
 Enrique Campos
 Alberto Creche
 Roberto Alberto Carmuega
 Juan de Juanini
 Angel Eduardo Blasco
 Luis Zabala
 Gloria Delma Tejerina de Salvatierra
 Sr, Jose Oscar Gil
 Norman Domingo Monteros
 Juan Carlos Alcoba. 
 Alfredo Darouiche. (present 2016)

School and education 
 School 4.324 Julio Ramon Pereyra (1925)
 School 4.440 Maria Agapita Toro de Lahud (1928)
 School 4.735 San Francisco de Asis (1934)
 School 4.542 Dr. Roberto Lanzi (1941)
 School 4.736 Mision la Loma (1944)
 School 4.736 San Miguel Arcangel (1947)
 School 4.525 de Timboirenda (1948)
 School 4.100 San Jose de Yacuy (1955)
 School 7.018 Nocturna Policarpo Segovia (1963)
 School 4.134 Gauchos de Guemes (1963)
 School 4.137 Virgen de Fatima (1964)
 High school de comercio 5.006 Mariano Moreno (1964)
 High School 3.120 de educación Tecnica (1966)
 School 4.149 Dique Itiyuro 1968)
 School 4.159 Regimiento 1 de infanteria Patricios de Campo Largo (1970)
 School 4.175 de Macueta 
 School 4.210 Vicente Lopez y Planes  (1973)
 School 4.242 Monseñor Francisco de la Cruz Muguerza (1977)
 BSPA 7.082 Republica Oriental del Uruguay (1988)
 High School 3.143 educación Tecnica (1984)
 School Technical 7.133 Monotecnica (1990)
 High School 3.130 tecnica Emeta II (1992)
 Tertiary school 7.052 Anexo de Educación Especial (1998)
 School 8.178 de la familia Agricola, padre Ernesto Martearena (2001)
 School 4.777 de el Algarrobal

References

Sources 
Argentina – World Gazetteer

Populated places in Salta Province